Munshi Premchand Mahavidyalaya, established in 2008, is general degree college in Sevok Road, Siliguri. It is in Darjeeling district. It offers undergraduate courses in arts. It is affiliated to  University of North Bengal.

Departments

Arts
Bengali
English
Nepali
Hindi
History
Political Science
Sociology
Education
Geography

See also

References

External links
Munshi Premchand Mahavidyalaya
University of North Bengal
University Grants Commission
National Assessment and Accreditation Council

Universities and colleges in Darjeeling district
Colleges affiliated to University of North Bengal
Educational institutions established in 2008
2008 establishments in West Bengal